Christopher Arthur Carroll (6 March 1924 – 16 April 1994) was an Australian rules footballer who played with North Melbourne in the Victorian Football League (VFL).

Carroll served in the Australian Army from 1942 to 1946.

Carroll, a left footer, trained with North Melbourne in late 1946 and impressed and moved to Melbourne from the Centrals Football Club in Broken Hill, New South Wales.

Carroll made his debut in round four, 1947 against Fitzroy, kicking one goal.

Notes

External links 

1924 births
1994 deaths
Australian rules footballers from New South Wales
North Melbourne Football Club players
St George AFC players